Madame Récamier is a 1928 French silent historical film directed by Tony Lekain and Gaston Ravel and starring Marie Bell, Françoise Rosay, and Edmond Van Daële. The film portrays the life of Juliette Récamier, a French society figure of the Napoleonic Era. She was also the subject of a 1920 German film of the same name.

Cast
 Marie Bell 
 Françoise Rosay 
 Edmond Van Daële 
 François Rozet
 Andrée Brabant 
 Nelly Cormon
 Roberte Cusey
 Jeanne de Balzac
 Jean Debucourt 
 Émile Drain as Napoleon  
 Mona Goya 
 Charles Le Bargy 
 Desdemona Mazza 
 Genica Missirio
 Madeleine Rodrigue
 Victor Vina

References

Bibliography 
 Klossner, Michael. The Europe of 1500-1815 on Film and Television: A Worldwide Filmography of Over 2550 Works, 1895 Through 2000. McFarland, 2002.

External links 
 

1928 films
1920s historical films
French historical films
French silent feature films
1920s French-language films
Films directed by Gaston Ravel
Films set in the 19th century
French black-and-white films
1920s French films